Mohamad Nor Bin Ismail (born 20 August 1982) is a Malaysian former international footballer who played as a striker.

Mohd Nor started his career with Kuala Lumpur FA. He was transferred to Perak during the 2005 season after spending four years with Kuala Lumpur FA. Later he was transferred to Johor FC but returned to Perak FA during the 2007/08 season.

Mohd Nor was called for duty with the Malaysia national team during the 2006 World Cup qualifier. Since then, he was selected part of Malaysia squad. He played for the 2004 Tiger Cup where Malaysia finished third after defeating Myanmar 2-1. He was also representing the Malaysia national under 23 side that won the bronze medal at the 2005 SEA Games.

International Senior Goals

External links
 

1982 births
Living people
Malaysian footballers
Malaysian people of Malay descent
Malaysia international footballers
Kuala Lumpur City F.C. players
Kuala Muda Naza F.C. players
Perak F.C. players
Southeast Asian Games bronze medalists for Malaysia
Southeast Asian Games medalists in football
Association football forwards
Competitors at the 2005 Southeast Asian Games